Konstantinovka is a rural locality (a selo) in Nikolayevsky Selsoviet, Tuymazinsky District, Bashkortostan, Russia. The population was 140 as of 2010. There are 3 streets.

Geography 
Konstantinovka is located 30 km southeast of Tuymazy (the district's administrative centre) by road. Serafimovka is the nearest rural locality.

References 

Rural localities in Tuymazinsky District